, formerly known as  from 2006 to 2016, is a Japanese publishing company owned by Animate. Libre primarily publishes yaoi and teens' love manga and light novels, which are run in their magazines Magazine Be × Boy and Be × Boy Gold. The company was founded on May 8, 2006, after Biblos closed in April 2006, when their original parent company, Hekitensha, filed for bankruptcy.

History

Biblos was originally formed under publisher Hekitensha in 1988 for publishing yaoi content, including magazines such as Magazine Be × Boy, Be × Boy Gold, and Junk! Boy. In 2006, Hekitensha declared bankruptcy, which caused Biblos to close in April 2006. All publications under Biblos were put on indefinite hiatus until they rebranded as Libre Publishing on May 8, 2006, with Animate as their parent company. Several magazines previously owned by Biblos were transferred to Libre, including Magazine Be × Boy and Be × Boy Gold. Other magazines and anthologies, such as Junk! and Zero, were later relaunched under different names; the anthology B-Boy LUV became B-Boy Phoenix. In 2016, Libre Publishing renamed their company as Libre.

Aside from print media, Libre publishes audio drama CDs under the labels Cue Egg Label and Melty Drop. Cue Egg Label was originally launched by Biblos and acquired under the rebranding; the label features audio adaptations of Libre's yaoi manga. Melty Drop is Libre's original label featuring adult-oriented otome situation drama CDs marketed to women.

English-licensing partnerships
In 2010, Animate USA announced that they would release some of Libre's books on the Amazon Kindle format, and in September of that year, Libre sent cease and desist notices to several scanlation groups.

In October 2011, the American manga publisher Viz Media launched the BL imprint SuBLime in collaboration with Libre and its parent company Animate to publish English-language BL for the print and worldwide digital market. In June 2016, Libre Publishing terminated their partnership with Digital Manga Publishing.

Controversies

After the closure of Biblos in April 2006, Libre gained the licenses for former Biblos titles. Central Park Media, who held the English license for North American publication with Biblos, continued to publish their former Biblos titles, and in 2007, Libre described CPM's continued publication of their titles as "illegal", saying that they needed to renegotiate licenses. Central Park Media stated in December 2007 that Libre had "refused to discuss" the issue with them, and that they regarded their licenses with Biblos as still being legally binding with Libre. After Central Park Media filed for bankruptcy in April 2009, Libre released another statement stating that they had not been in a business relationship for some time prior to this, and that Libre expected new titles to be released by their new US publishers.

On October 11, 2015, Libre issued an apology on their official website to manga artist Harada for publishing her dōjinshi in a special issue of B-Boy without her permission.

Publications

Magazines

Digital magazines

Anthologies

See also
Our Everlasting

References

External links
  

Manga distributors
Yaoi
Publishing companies established in 2006
Japanese companies established in 2006
Comic book publishing companies in Tokyo